The Lutheran Church of the Redeemer is the second Protestant church in Jerusalem (the first being Christ Church near Jaffa Gate). It is a property of the Evangelical Jerusalem Foundation, one of the three foundations of the Evangelical Church in Germany (EKD) in the Holy Land. Built between 1893 and 1898 by the architect Paul Ferdinand Groth following the designs of Friedrich Adler, the Church of the Redeemer currently houses Lutheran congregations that worship in Arabic, German, Danish, and English. The Church, together with the adjoining provost building, is the seat of the Provost of the German Protestant Ministries in the Holy Land ("Evangelisch in Jerusalem"). It also serves as the headquarters of the Bishop of the Evangelical Lutheran Church in Jordan and the Holy Land, since this Arabic-speaking (Palestinian) church became independent from the German provost in 1979.

Built on land given to King William I of Prussia (after 1870 Kaiser Wilhelm I) on the occasion of the latter's participation at the inauguration of the Suez Canal in 1869 by Sultan Abdülhamid of the Ottoman Empire, the church was constructed from 1892 to 1898. The location had been the site of the old church of St. Mary Minor. In 1898, Kaiser Wilhelm II made a trip to Jerusalem to personally dedicate the new church. For the dedication of the church, the Kaiser entered the city on horse back through two specially made ceremonial arches, one a gift of the Ottoman Empire and one a gift from the local Jewish community. The church was dedicated on Reformation Day, 1898. At the dedication, Wilhelm said:

Redeemer Church was closed for services from the end of May 1940 until 1950, when first the Palestinian Lutheran congregation resumed services, and later the Evangelical congregation of German language followed.

In the garden next to the church is a memorial marking the location of the crusader headquarters of the Order of the Knights of St. John.

Archaeological park
The archaeological park "Durch die Zeiten" ("Through the centuries") below the nave of the Church of the Redeemer, opened in November 2012, offers the possibility to experience more than 2,000 years of history of the city of Jerusalem by walking through it. The archaeological excavations, conducted by Conrad Schick and Ute Wagner-Lux (the former director of German Protestant Institute of Archaeology in the Holy Land (GPIA)) in 1893, and then Karl Vriezen from 1970 to 1974, have been prepared by the (GPIA) in 2009–2012 to present to visitors the different stages of development and building of Jerusalem.

The adjoining cloister of the vicarage maintains a museum for more information and exhibits on the city's history.

Pastors and provosts
Beginning in 1852, a pastor served the German-speaking Protestant congregation in Jerusalem. Starting in 1871, the congregation convened in the Muristan Chapel, moving to Redeemer Church upon its opening. These pastors are ranked provost. The congregation shares Mount Zion Cemetery for their deceased. Between 1903 and 1940 the provostry was located in its own building in #42 Street of the Prophets (today's Jerusalem ORT campus); it is now next to Redeemer Church. Today the provost serves the German-speaking Protestant congregation and is simultaneously the representative of the Evangelical Church in Germany in Israel, the West Bank and Jordan. In this capacity, he oversees the properties of the Evangelical Jerusalem Foundation and the Kaiserin Auguste Victoria-Foundation in Jerusalem as well as the German Protestant Community Center in Amman, Jordan.

The church ordained the first Palestinian woman pastor in the Holy Land, Sally Azar, on 22 January 2023. Azar will head the English-speaking congregation in the church and be one of five ordained female leaders in the Middle East.

List of pastors and provosts with their terms:

1852–1866 Friedrich Peter Valentiner (*1817–1894*)
1866–1869 Carl Hoffmann (*1836–1903*), nephew of Christoph Hoffmann
1870–1876 Hermann Weser (*1842–1911*)
1876–1884 Carl Reinicke (*1850–1915*)
1885–1895 Carl Schlicht (*1855–1930*)
1895–1903 Paul Hoppe (*1856–1937*), ranked provost since 1898
1903–1910 Wilhelm Bussmann (*1864–1936*)
1910–1921 Friedrich Jeremias (*1868–1945*), interned by the British forces since 1918, later exiled, father of Joachim Jeremias
1921 Gustaf Dalman (per pro)
1921–1922 Albrecht Alt
1923–1930 Hans Wilhelm Hertzberg (*1895–1965*)
1930–1938 Ernst Rhein (*1885–1969*)
1938–1954 Johannes Doering (*1900–1969*), interned by the British forces by end of May 1940 till 1945
1954–1960 Joachim Weigelt
1960–1965 Carl Malsch (*1916–2001*), simultaneously spiritual head of the Evangelical Lutheran Church in Jordan (and the Holy Land) (ELCJ)
1965–1971 Hansgeorg Köhler, simultaneously spiritual head of ELCJ
1971–1979 Helmut Glatte, until 1977 simultaneously spiritual head of ELCJ
1979–1985 Jürgen Wehrmann
1985–1991 Johannes Friedrich
1991–2001 Karl-Heinz Ronecker
2001–2006 Martin Reyer
2006–2012 Uwe Gräbe
2012– Wolfgang Schmidt

See also
Christianity in Israel
Palestinian Christians

References

External links
Homepage

Churches in Jerusalem
Protestant churches in Jerusalem
Lutheran churches in Israel
Lutheran church buildings in the State of Palestine
Churches completed in 1898
19th-century Lutheran churches
Christian Quarter
William I, German Emperor
Wilhelm II, German Emperor